György Surányi (born January 3, 1954) is Hungarian economist the CEO and chairman of CIB Bank and former president of the Hungarian National Bank.

Career
Surányi has been president of the Hungarian national Bank between 1990–1991 and again in 1995-2001. In his second tenure as central banker from 1995 he played a role in the restoration of balance to the Hungarian economy and getting inflation under control. In the same period he co-authored the Bokros package, a series of measures cutting both the budget and current account deficits. Surányi is also the regional head of Intesa Sanpaolo a banking group of Italy. Under Surányi, the Hungarian Forint (HUF), became fully convertible for the first time. In March 2009 his name was mentioned as a possible replacement for outgoing Prime Minister Ferenc Gyurcsány. Hungarian political party SZDSZ announced that Surányi was acceptable to them as a candidate for Prime Minister. Party leader Gábor Fodor said, Surányi is the one who could restore trust, and govern the country free of party influences. Surányi was asked about his possible nomination and said that a new government will need clear support from all parliamentary parties "even if to a different degree". 

President of Hungary László Sólyom stated that instead of a short term transitional government ruling only until the 2010 elections, early elections should be held. Surányi himself remained noncommittal declining to say whether he would accept the position of PM if nominated. Hungarian political party Fidesz has said it will not support any new government including one led by Surányi. This not a personal problem, they support only a new, early parliamentary election. Surányi became the frontrunner candidate for the post of Prime Minister however on the 26th of March he pulled out of the race saying he would not take the job. 

The World Economic Forum titled him to Global Leader of Tomorrow, in 1993. In 1996, Euromoney named Surányi the central banker of the year in Central and Eastern Europe. Surányi reached the academic rank of full professor in 1998. He lectured at the Central European University.

Personal life
He is married. His wife is Dr Judit Marmoly. They have a daughter, Szilvia and a son, Gábor.

See also
National Bank of Hungary

References

External links
CV (Hungarian)

Hungarian economists
Governors of the Hungarian National Bank
Politicians from Budapest
1954 births
Living people
Corvinus University of Budapest alumni